Juan Adolfo Turri (22 December 1950 – 16 March 2010) was an Argentine athlete. He competed in the men's shot put at the 1976 Summer Olympics.

References

1950 births
2010 deaths
Athletes (track and field) at the 1975 Pan American Games
Athletes (track and field) at the 1976 Summer Olympics
Argentine male shot putters
Olympic athletes of Argentina
Place of birth missing
Pan American Games competitors for Argentina